Genntown is an unincorporated community in Warren County, in the U.S. state of Ohio.

History
The community was named after Colonel Jethro Genn, an early settler. The name was sometimes spelled "Genn Town".

References

Unincorporated communities in Warren County, Ohio